DYDC (104.7 FM) is a low-power radio station owned and operated by the Visayas State University. Its studios are located at the 2nd Floor, ADE Bldg., Visayas State University, Brgy. Pangasugan, Baybay. DYDC operates Weekdays from 8 am to 5 pm.

The station serves as a training ground for community broadcasting and Development communication students of the Visayas State University.

History

DYDC was established in 1982 on AM with a frequency of 1449 kHz. Back then, it could receive signal from the major parts of Western Leyte, Eastern Visayas, parts of Northern Mindanao, and Southern Luzon. The station's various developmental programs in agriculture like the school-on-the-air has benefited several farmers. It initially operated 12 hours a day: from 7 am to 7 pm. In 2013, it ceased operations after its transmitter was damaged by Typhoon Haiyan.

In the rebuilding efforts following the devastation, the Commission on Higher Education granted VSU P1 million pesos for the repair of the station. On June 9, 2014, it was relaunched, this time on FM in response to the listeners’ survey which showed that most people listen to FM than AM radio.

References

College radio stations in the Philippines
Radio stations established in 2014
Radio stations in Leyte (province)